Warren James Carne (born 14 October 1975) is a former Zimbabwean cyclist.

Early years
His family relocated to South Africa from Zimbabwe in the mid 1980s with Carne attending Potchefstroom Boys High. He graduated from the same class as the South African Boxer Sean Santana and Olympic 800 metre runner Hezekiél Sepeng.

Cycling career
As a junior he dabbled in time trialing on the road before turning his attention to mountain biking. He placed 12th at the 2005 Zimbabwean National XC Championships held in Harare. Carne was a member of the Zimbabwe squad that competed at the inaugural 2007 UCI African Mountain Bike Championships that were contested in Windhoek, Namibia. The championships also served as a qualifying event for the 2008 Summer Olympics and it was here that Carne's team mate Antipass Kwari created history by securing the country an entry for the Beijing edition of the games. Zimbabwe up until that point had never competed at the Olympics in the mountain bike discipline before.

Carne & Timothy Jones, who raced at the 2001 Giro d'Italia share the same grandfather.

Career highlights
2005

12th Zimbabwean National Mountain Bike Championships, Harare (ZIM)

10th Gauteng & North Gauteng Interprovincial, Johannesburg (RSA)

2007

Member of the Zimbabwe cycling team that competed at the African Mountainbike Championship held in Windhoek (NAM)

See also
 Zimbabwe Cycling Federation
 Union Cycliste Internationale

References

External links

Zimbabwean mountain bikers
Zimbabwean people of British descent
1975 births
Living people
Sportspeople from Bulawayo
Zimbabwean expatriates in South Africa
Cricket historians and writers